Bruceina eos is a species of sea snail, a marine gastropod mollusk in the family Calliostomatidae.

Description

Distribution
This marine species occurs off South Africa at depths between 85 m and 240 m.

References

 Marshall, B. A. (1988). Thysanodontinae: a new subfamily of the Trochidae (Gastropoda). The Journal of Molluscan Studies. 54 (2): 215–229
 Özdikmen H. (2013) Substitute names for three preoccupied generic names in Gastropoda. Munis Entomology & Zoology 8(1): 252–256

Endemic fauna of South Africa
eos
Gastropods described in 1988